"The Word Is Out" is a song by American singer Jermaine Stewart, which was released in 1984 as the lead single from his debut studio album The Word Is Out. The song was written by Stewart, Julian Lindsay and Greg Craig, and produced by Peter Collins. "The Word Is Out" peaked at No. 41 on the US Billboard Hot 100 in March 1985.

Music video
The song's music video was shot in Paris. The dance sequences were shot in the settings of both an aerobic class and nightclub.

Critical reception
On its release, Billboard noted, "Collins borrows the Shannon sound for a high-voltage setting." Radio Luxembourg DJ Mike Hollis, writing for the Daily Mirror, described the song as "a good one" and predicted it would be a hit in the UK. Mat Snow of New Musical Express considered "The Word Is Out" to be a "mildly attractive sub-Junior song".

Mark Cooper of Number One felt the song was "very contemporary" but "rather bland". He stated, "Stewart launches his solo career with one of those dance records, all synths and drum machines thumping away like a dentist with an extractor." Graham K of Record Mirror was unfavourable, writing, "I really don't think that nicking the Art of Noise's megalithic beat box theories will rescue a no-no tune." In a retrospective review of The Word Is Out album, Dan LeRoy of AllMusic noted the song's "crunching, big-beat chorus".

Track listing
7–inch single (10 Records release)
"The Word Is Out" – 3:30
"The Word Is Out" (Instrumental) – 4:33

7–inch single (Arista Records US release)
"The Word Is Out" – 3:27
"Month of Mondays" – 3:27

12–inch single (Arista Records US release)
"The Word Is Out" (Extended Version) – 6:52
"The Word Is Out" (Dub Version) – 7:04

12–inch single (Arista Records US promo release)
"The Word Is Out" (Extended Version) – 6:52
"The Word Is Out" (Dub Version) – 7:04
"The Word Is Out" (Short Version) – 3:30

12–inch single (10 Records release)
"The Word Is Out" (West Mix - Extended Version) – 6:52
"The Word Is Out" – 3:30
"The Word Is Out" (East Mix - Extended Version) – 7:00

Personnel
Production
 Peter Collins – producer
 Julian Mendelsohn – engineer

Other
 Max Vadukal – photography
 Da Gama – cover design

Charts

References

1984 songs
1984 debut singles
Jermaine Stewart songs
Virgin Records singles
Arista Records singles
Song recordings produced by Peter Collins (record producer)
Songs written by Jermaine Stewart